NGC 559 (also known as Caldwell 8) is an open cluster and Caldwell object in the constellation Cassiopeia. It shines at magnitude +9.5. Its celestial coordinates are RA , dec . It is located near the open cluster NGC 637, and the bright magnitude +2.2 irregular variable star Gamma Cassiopeiae. The cluster is 7 arcmins across.

References

External links
 
 
 
 
 

Open clusters
0559
008b
Cassiopeia (constellation)
17871109